Amblyseius pamperisi is a species of mite in the family Phytoseiidae.

References

pamperisi
Articles created by Qbugbot
Animals described in 1997